Paralympic athletics at the 2017 ASEAN Para Games was held at Bukit Jalil National Stadium at the National Sports Complex in Kuala Lumpur, Malaysia.

Medal tally

Medalists

Men

Women

See also
 Athletics at the 2017 Southeast Asian Games
 Athletics at the 2018 Asian Para Games

External links
 Athletics at Games Result System  

2017 ASEAN Para Games
Athletics at the ASEAN Para Games
ASEAN Para Games